Shuntuk is a rural locality (a khutor) in Timiryazevskoye Rural Settlement of Maykopsky District, the Republic of Adygea, Russia. The population was 919 as of 2018. There are 15 streets.

Geography 
Shuntuk is located 9 km south of Tulsky (the district's administrative centre) by road. Podgorny is the nearest rural locality.

References 

Rural localities in Maykopsky District